Ronald Linn Rivest (born May 6, 1947) is a cryptographer and an Institute Professor at MIT. He is  a member of MIT's Department of Electrical Engineering and Computer Science (EECS) and a member of MIT's Computer Science and Artificial Intelligence Laboratory (CSAIL). His work has spanned the fields of algorithms and combinatorics, cryptography, machine learning, and election integrity.

Rivest is one of the inventors of the RSA algorithm (along with Adi Shamir and Len Adleman). He is the inventor of the symmetric key encryption algorithms RC2, RC4, RC5, and co-inventor of RC6. The "RC" stands for "Rivest Cipher", or alternatively, "Ron's Code". (RC3 was broken at RSA Security during development; similarly, RC1 was never published.)  He also authored the MD2, MD4, MD5 and MD6 cryptographic hash functions.

Education

Rivest earned a Bachelor's degree in Mathematics from Yale University in 1969, and a Ph.D. degree in Computer Science from Stanford University in 1974 for research supervised by Robert W. Floyd.

Career and research
At MIT, Rivest is a member of the Theory of Computation Group, and founder of MIT CSAIL's Cryptography and Information Security Group.

He is a co-author of Introduction to Algorithms (also known as CLRS), a standard textbook on algorithms, with Thomas H. Cormen, Charles E. Leiserson and Clifford Stein. Other contributions to the field of algorithms include the paper, "Time Bounds for Selection", which gives a worst-case linear-time algorithm.

In 2006, he published his invention of the ThreeBallot voting system, a voting system that incorporates the ability for the voter to discern that their vote was counted while still protecting their voter privacy. Most importantly, this system does not rely on cryptography at all. Stating "Our democracy is too important", he simultaneously placed ThreeBallot in the public domain. He was a member of the Election Assistance Commission's Technical Guidelines Development Committee, tasked with assisting the EAC in drafting the Voluntary Voting System Guidelines.

Rivest frequently collaborates with other researchers in combinatorics, for example working with David A. Klarner to find an upper bound on the number of polyominoes of a given order and working with Jean Vuillemin to prove the deterministic form of the Aanderaa–Rosenberg conjecture.

He was also a founder of RSA Data Security (now merged with Security Dynamics to form RSA Security), Verisign, and of Peppercoin. Rivest has research interests in algorithms, cryptography and voting. His former doctoral students include Avrim Blum, Burt Kaliski, Anna Lysyanskaya, Ron Pinter, Robert Schapire, Alan Sherman,
and Mona Singh.

Publications
His publications include:

Honors and awards
Rivest is a member of the National Academy of Engineering, the National Academy of Sciences, and is a Fellow of the Association for Computing Machinery, the International Association for Cryptologic Research, and the American Academy of Arts and Sciences. Together with Adi Shamir and Len Adleman, he has been awarded the 2000 IEEE Koji Kobayashi Computers and Communications Award and the Secure Computing Lifetime Achievement Award. He also shared with them the Turing Award. Rivest has received an honorary degree (the "laurea honoris causa") from the Sapienza University of Rome. In 2005, he received the MITX Lifetime Achievement Award.  Rivest was named in 2007 the Marconi Fellow, and on May 29, 2008 he also gave the Chesley lecture at Carleton College. He was named an Institute Professor at MIT in June 2015.

References

External links

 List of Ron Rivest's patents on IPEXL
 Home page of Ronald L. Rivest
 Official site of RSA Security Inc.
 Ron Rivest election research papers

American computer scientists
American cryptographers
1947 births
Living people
Computer security academics
Public-key cryptographers
Election technology people
International Association for Cryptologic Research fellows
Members of the United States National Academy of Sciences
Members of the United States National Academy of Engineering
Turing Award laureates
MIT School of Engineering faculty
Scientists from Schenectady, New York
Fellows of the Association for Computing Machinery
Yale University alumni
Timothy Dwight College alumni
Stanford University alumni
People from Arlington, Massachusetts
20th-century American engineers
21st-century American engineers
20th-century American scientists
21st-century American scientists
Mathematicians from New York (state)